Ebaziya (foaled 18 March 1989) is a retired Irish-bred Thoroughbred racehorse and mare who won three Listed races. As a broodmare, she has bred four individual Group 1 winners.

Background
Ebaziya was foaled on 18 March 1989 and was bred at the Aga Khan's Studs. She was sired by Darshaan. Ebaziya's dam is Ezana, hailed also from the Aga Khan's Studs. Ezana was bought by Jim and Mary McDonald of Herbage Stud in 1994. Ebaziya is a granddaughter of Dan Cupid's daughter, Evisa.

Ebaziya was trained by John Oxx. She was given to Queen Elizabeth II as an 80th birthday present by Aga Khan in 2006.

Racing career
Ebaziya won three listed races in Ireland. At 2 years, she was the winner of the Ratoath Fillies race. At 3 years, she won three races, Ballysax Stakes, Oyster Stakes and Trigo Stakes, all in Leopardstown. She was ridden by  Johnny Murtagh.

Stud record
Ebaziya has 14 offspring. She went to stud in 1993 and her first mate was Sadler's Wells, producing Ebadiyla. Other offspring include Ebaza, Ebaraya (by Sadler's Wells), Elapour (by Sadler's Wells), Edallora (by Refuse To Bend), Elasouna (by Rainbow Quest), Ebatana (by Rainbow Quest), Elbasana, Erzen (foaled 17 March 2005, by Daylami), Eytarna (by Dubai Destination), and Ezbek (by Rainbow Quest). After being given to the Queen, Ebaziya was sent to German sire Monsun, resulting Estimate in 2009 when she was 20.

Eight of Ebaziya's offspring are the winners of various races. Four won the races at Group 1 level, the 1997 Irish Oaks and the Prix Royal Oak winner Ebadiyla, and the 1998 Moyglare Stud Stakes scorer Edabiya. In addition, Enzeli and Estimate are the winners of the Ascot Gold Cup in 1999 and 2013, respectively. Estimate won it for Queen Elizabeth II.

Assessment
Ebaziya was rated 97 at two years and 111 at three years by Timeform.

Pedigree

References

1989 racehorse births
Racehorses bred in Ireland
Racehorses trained in Ireland
Thoroughbred family 13-c